Ronnie Rose Elliott (1910–1982) was an American sculptor and collagist, who worked also as a printmaker, using the techniques of lithography and etching.

Biography 
She was born in New York City, and worked first as a sculptor. With a scholarship at the Art Students League of New York she studied painting, but only for a few months. She travelled in Europe, lived at Honolulu, and exhibited at the Salon des Réalités Nouvelles around 1950. Returning to New York, she exhibited at the Rose Fried Gallery.

Notes

1910 births
1982 deaths
Collage artists
American women printmakers
20th-century American sculptors
20th-century American women artists
20th-century American printmakers